The ISTAF Indoor is an indoor track and field meeting which takes place at the Mercedes-Benz Arena in Berlin, Germany. The inaugural edition took place on March 1, 2014. Since 2021 the ISS Dome in Düsseldorf will host a second event under the name ISTAF Indoor Düsseldorf.

Meeting Records

Men

Women

References

External links
 Official website

Athletics competitions in Germany
Recurring sporting events established in 2014
Sports competitions in Berlin
Annual indoor track and field meetings
2014 establishments in Germany
Athletics in Berlin